Irakli Sikharulidze (born 18 July 1990) is a professional Georgian football striker who currently plays in Georgia for Locomotive Tbilisi.

He is a member of Georgia national football team as well, making debut in 2017 in a friendly game against Cyprus.

International career

International goals
Scores and results list Georgia's goal tally first.

References

External links
 

1990 births
Footballers from Tbilisi
Living people
Footballers from Georgia (country)
Association football forwards
Georgia (country) international footballers
FC Kakheti Telavi players
FC Merani Martvili players
FC Dinamo Tbilisi players
FC WIT Georgia players
FC Metalurgi Rustavi players
FC Dinamo Batumi players
FC Zestafoni players
FC Samtredia players
FC Sioni Bolnisi players
FC Lokomotivi Tbilisi players
1. FC Slovácko players
FK RFS players
Erovnuli Liga players
Latvian Higher League players
Expatriate footballers from Georgia (country)
Expatriate footballers in the Czech Republic
Expatriate footballers in Latvia